Paul Price Yoder (June 25, 1897 – September 1, 1965) was an American politician who served as the 46th lieutenant governor of Ohio from 1937 to 1939. He died of cancer in a North Carolina veterans' hospital in 1965.

References

Lieutenant Governors of Ohio
Presidents of the Ohio State Senate
1897 births
1965 deaths
20th-century American politicians
People from Logan County, Ohio